Acutolysin A (also called AaH I) is a toxin found in the snake Agkistrodon acutus. It is a strongly hemorrhagic metalloproteinase. It has a molecular weight of 22 kDa.

References

External links
Snake venom metalloproteinase acutolysin-A
Proteases